Maurizio Margaglio (born 16 November 1974) is an Italian ice dancing coach and former competitor. With partner Barbara Fusar-Poli, he is the 2001 World champion, 2001 European champion, and 2002 Olympic bronze medalist. They won nine Italian titles and competed at three Olympics.

Competitive career 
Margaglio began skating at age ten, directly in ice dancing. Early in his career, Margaglio was a three-time Italian junior champion with Claudia Frigoli.

Barbara Fusar-Poli asked Margaglio to skate with her after her partner retired. He and Fusar-Poli began skating on the senior level in 1994-95, and enjoyed some success in the first years of their career, including winning several Grand Prix medals. In 1999-2000, they won their first medals at the European and World Championships, finishing in second place at both events.

The following season was very successful for the duo, who won every event they entered and became the first Italians to win a World title in any discipline. They were not as successful in 2001-02, dropping to second at the Europeans and finishing third at the 2002 Winter Olympics. Their medal at the Olympics was not without some controversy, after Margaglio fell during the free dance portion. The result was protested by the Lithuanian team, who had finished fifth, but the protest was denied. Fusar-Poli/Margaglio did not compete at the 2002 World Championships and would not return to eligible skating until the 2005-06 season.

With the 2006 Winter Olympics being held in Turin, Fusar-Poli/Margaglio decided to return and compete in their home country. They did not skate in any international events prior to the Olympics, but did win the Italian National Championships. The Olympics were their first international event under the new scoring system adopted by the ISU, but, Fusar-Poli/Margaglio nonetheless held a narrow lead after the compulsory dance portion of the event, ahead of two-time world champions Tatiana Navka / Roman Kostomarov. This result was described in some news stories at the time as "shocking". In the original dance, Fusar-Poli/Margaglio were performing a rotational lift with only seconds left in their program when Margaglio lost his balance, dropped Fusar-Poli, and fell to the ice himself. Following this conclusion to the program, Fusar-Poli stood glaring at her partner for approximately thirty seconds before the couple took their bows and left the ice. They dropped to seventh overall, but moved up to sixth place after a clean free dance, and told the media that the incident at the end of the original dance had reflected their anger at the mistake rather than at each other. Several years later, Fusar-Poli said that there were Swarovski crystals on the ice from the costumes of earlier competitors, but that the fall was a result of their own mistake and not the ice conditions. The Olympics were Fusar-Poli/Margaglio's final competitive event together, but they continued to perform in shows.

Later career 
In 2010, Margaglio began working once a month or every two months with senior and junior Finnish synchronized skating teams. In 2011, Margaglio signed a three-year contract to head and develop Finland's ice dancing program, and was appointed to the position of Olympic Youth Coach.

His current students include:
 Juulia Turkkila / Matthias Versluis
 Yuka Orihara / Juho Pirinen
 Natacha Lagouge / Arnaud Caffa
 Chelsea Verhaegh / Sherim van Geffen
 Paulina Ramanauskaitė / Deividas Kizala

Personal life 
Margaglio was born on 16 November 1974 in Milan. His mother was a housewife and his father an accountant.

He began a relationship with German figure skater Jyrina Lorenz by 1998. They are married and have three sons: Gabriel (born 6 June 2007), Sebastian (born in August 2009) and Julian (born in January 2012 in Helsinki).

Programs 
With Fusar-Poli

Results 
GP: Champions Series / Grand Prix

With Fusar-Poli

With Frigoli

References

External links 

Official Fusar Poli & Margaglio website
Fusar Poli and Margaglio

1974 births
Living people
Italian male ice dancers
Olympic figure skaters of Italy
Figure skaters at the 1998 Winter Olympics
Figure skaters at the 2002 Winter Olympics
Figure skaters at the 2006 Winter Olympics
Olympic bronze medalists for Italy
Figure skaters from Milan
Olympic medalists in figure skating
World Figure Skating Championships medalists
European Figure Skating Championships medalists
Medalists at the 2002 Winter Olympics